Qingping may refer to:

People 
Chen Qingping (1795–1868), Chinese martial artist
Guo Qingping, representative of the Tianjin constituency in the 11th National People's Congress
Li Qingping, chairman of China CITIC Bank
Li Qingping (swimmer), Chinese finswimming medal winner in the 2001 World Games
Zeng Qingping, Chinese medal winner in the 2009 Asian Wrestling Championships
Fang Qingping, disciple of Chinese performer Li Jindou
Kong Qingping, chairman of China State Construction International Holdings
Su Qingping, a fictional character in the Chinese TV series The Great Dunhuang
Zeng Qingping, a teacher whose life forms the basis of the 2014 Chinese film The Class of One

Places in China 
Qingping, Chongqing (清平), a town in Hechuan District, Chongqing
Qingping, Gansu (庆坪), a town in Weiyuan County, Gansu
Qingping, Guangdong (青平), a town in Lianjiang, Guangdong
Qingping, Hubei (清坪), a town in Xianfeng County, Hubei
Qingping, Hunan (青坪), a town in Yongshun County, Hunan
Qingping, Leshan (青平), a town in Leshan, Sichuan
Qingping, Shandong, a town in Gaotang County, Shandong
Qingping, Wusheng County (清平), a town in Wusheng County, Sichuan
Qingping Subdistrict (清平街道), a subdistrict in Shunhe Hui District, Kaifeng, Henan
Qingping Township, Guizhou (庆坪乡), a township in Ceheng County, Guizhou
Qingping Township, Mianzhu (清平乡), a township in Mianzhu, Sichuan
Qingping Township, Yunnan (清平乡), a township in Longchuan County, Yunnan
Qingping Yi Ethnic Township (清平彝族乡), a township in Pingshan County, Sichuan
Qingping, a township in the city of Mianzhu, Sichuan
Qingping, a village in Fumin County, Yunnan
Qingping Expressway, a provincial expressway in Guangdong
Qingping Village (青坪村), an administrative division of Cha'ensi, Xiangtan, Hunan
Qingping Village (清平村), a village in Xidu, Hunan
Qingping Village, a village in Yueshan, Xiangxiang, Hunan

See also 
Gaotang Qingping National Ecopark, a protected area in Shandong